The 2021 LCS season was the fourth year of North America's League Championship Series, a professional esports league for the MOBA PC game League of Legends, under partnership and the ninth overall.

The pre-season Lock In tournament began on January 15 and concluded on January 31.

The spring regular season began on February 5 and concluded on March 14. The Mid-Season Showdown, which replaced the spring playoffs, began on March 20 and concluded on April 11. The summer regular season began on June 4 and concluded on August 1.

The three teams that qualified for the World Championship in 2021 were 100 Thieves, Team Liquid, and Cloud9.

League changes 
Shortly after the conclusion of the 2020 World Championship, Riot Games announced several major changes regarding the league's format. A new, three-week preseason tournament was introduced, titled the LCS Lock In. The top two teams from the previous season would be able to choose their opponents, selecting them into 2 groups for a play-in group stage. Each group would play in a four-day single Round Robin, with the top four teams from each group being seeded into an eight-team, single-elimination bracket. The winner of the bracket would receive a cash prize of US$150,000, along with a US$50,000 donation to the charity of their choice.

The regular season schedule was expanded to five games each day, across three days (Friday, Saturday, and Sunday). The spring playoffs were also replaced with the "Mid-Season Showdown". While the playoff format remained nearly identical to previous seasons, there were three minor changes. The first seed must now always play the fourth seed, rather than choosing their opponent; side selection always goes to the team that most recently dropped from the upper bracket; and ties would now be broken by seeding. The winner of the Mid-Season Showdown would qualify for the 2021 Mid-Season Invitational. Standings and team records from the spring regular season would be continued into the summer regular season as opposed to resetting like previous seasons.

In January 2021, the league rebranded its logo, featuring a new logo and refreshed visual identity.

Broadcasting
The live English broadcast was available on the LoL Esports website, as well as on Twitch and YouTube. A Spanish broadcast was produced by the LCS team FlyQuest.

Lock In

Group stage 
 Group A

 Group B

Knockout stage

Spring

Teams and rosters

Regular season

Mid-Season Showdown

Awards

Ranking

Summer

Teams and rosters

Regular season

Playoffs

Awards

Ranking

References 

2021 in esports
2021 multiplayer online battle arena tournaments
League of Legends Championship Series seasons